Walsh Cove Provincial Park is a provincial park in located on the northeast corner of West Redonda Island in British Columbia, Canada.  The park is approximately 85 ha. in size and overlooks Waddington Channel.

References

Provincial Parks of the Discovery Islands
Provincial parks of British Columbia